Désiré Louis Corneille Dondeyne (21 July 1921 – 12 February 2015) was a French conductor, composer and teacher who was born in Laon in the Aisne département.

He studied music at the conservatory in Lille and beginning in 1936 at the Conservatoire de Paris.  Dondeyne earned first prize in clarinet, chamber music, harmony, fugue, counterpoint and composition.  From 1939 to 1953 he was the solo clarinet with the Musique de l’air (the French Air Force Band). From 1954-79, he was conductor of La Musique des Gardiens de la Paix (the Paris metropolitan police band).

Dondeyne expanded the works of the wind orchestra by his discoveries, his own compositions and with personal encouragement from other composers.  The wind orchestra repertory was enriched with compositions from Jacques Castérède, Louis Durey, Gabriel Fauré, Jacques Ibert, Charles Koechlin, Darius Milhaud, Florent Schmitt, Germaine Tailleferre and Kurt Weill. With the Musique des Gardiens de la Paix he traveled throughout Europe and made over 100 recordings (including the famous Anthology of French Marches, produced by Jean-Marie Le Pen), and won several Grand Prix du Disques.

He was appointed in 1979 to the governing board of the French Ministry of Culture. He was the director of the conservatory of Issy-les-Moulineaux, a small suburb outside of Paris, from 1980 until 1986.  Dondeyne also composed and arranged a large number of compositions from instrumental to symphonic.

Recordings with Dondeyne and the Musique des Gardiens de la Paix have been issued in the U.S. on the Calliope, Nonesuch Records and Westminster labels.  Included in his recordings are two versions (band, and band with chorus) of Hector Berlioz’s Grande symphonie funèbre et triomphale.

Honours
Honours bestowed upon Dondeyne included his having been inducted as an honorary life member of the World Association for Bands and Ensembles (WASBE).

Death
Dondeyne died on 12 February 2015, aged 93.

Works

Concert Band Works
 1964 -- Ouverture pour un festival
 1964 -- Symphonia sacra
 Entree et Aspersion
 Litanies
 La Verité Salutaire
 1968 -- Ballade pour une fête populaire
 1968 -- Deux Danses
 Sarabande
 Pantomime
 1968 -- Les Nichons: Fantaisie pour deux clarinettes et orchestre d'harmonie
 1978 -- Nuances Pour Orchestre d'Harmonie - Divertissement sur un Thème de Fugue
 Prélude (Anches fluides)
 Adagio et Scherzetto (Cuivres doux)
 1984 -- Petit symphonie landaise
 "As-Tu-Pédat"
 "Cassecan"
 Rondo final ("Lou Patissou" - "La Dacquoise")
 1987 -- Trois Pièces caracteristiques
 Catalane
 Sérénade
 Valse
 1992 -- In memoriam Igor Stravinsky
 1992 -- Coup de vents
 1994 -- Symphonie des souvenirs
 1996 -- Caractères
 Air Tendre
 Air Tranquille
 Air Léger
 Air Martial
 2004 -- Sevillana
 Cinq interludes en forme de danse
 Classic suite Fantaisie en 6 numéros pour orchestre d'harmonie
 Intrada
 Danse
 Choral
 Rigaudon
 Nocturne
 Cortège (Final)
 Concertino pour accordion solo et orchestre d'harmonie
 Concerto grosso pour euphonium ou baryton, percussions et harmonie de chambre
 Concerto lyrique pour alto-saxophone et orchestre d'harmonie
 Allegro - giocoso
 Lent
 Allegro - Scherzando
 Allegro vivo
 Divertimento pour tuba et orchestre d'harmonie
 Fanfanera pour orchestre d'fanfare
 Fantasie sentimentale
 Fortryssimo
 France en chansons (la) pour chœur et orchestre d'harmonie
 Fugue
 Jeux interdits
 Jubile et Marche
 Le Petit Quinquin 
 Litanies pour un samedi saint
 Marche du fête
 Menuet
 Ouverture Ballet
 Ouverture fédérale
 Ouverture circonstancielle
 Pour un Siecle Nouveau...
 Sérénade
 Suite parodique
 Ouverture miniature
 Badinerie
 Charleston
 Marche
 Fanfare finale
 Symphonie No. 4
 Symphonie "Fidélité"
 1er Mouvement
 2e Mouvement
 3e Mouvement
 Finale
 Symphonie des saisons
 Toccafuga - loca - Toccata
 Toccarina
 Variations sur la berceuse "Le Petit Quinquin"
 Variations sur un thème montagnard

Chamber Works
 3 Esquisses pour 2 cors, 3 trompettes, 3 trombones et tuba
 3 Pièces N°2 des 9 Grands Duos pour 2 clarinettes
 12 Déchiffrages für verschiedene Gruppen von Instrumenten
 Cantabile et Caprice pour trombone et piano
 Cérès pour saxophone et piano
 Choral et Variations sur le Nom de Tony Aubin pour quatuor de clarinettes
 Concertino pour clarinette et piano
 Concerto lyrique pour saxophone et piano
 Double-Fugue pour quatuor de clarinettes
 Double Fugue N°3 des 9 Grands Duos pour 2 clarinettes
 Io pour flûte ou hautbois et piano
 Jupiter pour trompette et piano
 Légende N°9 des 9 Grands Duos pour 2 clarinettes
 Lune pour trompette et piano
 Mars pour trompette et piano
 Mercure pour saxophone et piano
 Musique pour Cuivres pour 2 trompettes, tor, trombone, tuba
 Neptune pour clarinette et piano
 Ouverture N°1 des 9 Grands Duos pour 2 clarinettes
 Pallas pour cor et piano
 Pastorale N°4 des 9 Grands Duos pour 2 clarinettes
 Petite Musique de Cuivres No. 1 pour 2 trompettes, cor, trombone, tuba
 Petite Musique de Cuivres No. 2 pour 2 trompettes, cor, trombone, tuba
 Petite Suite Pastorale pour 4 clarinettes en sib et clarinette basse
 Pluton pour saxophone et piano
 Pour Se Distraire pour 4 bassons
 Pour Se Divertir pour 3 bassons
 Prélude pour basson ou violoncelle et piano
 Préludes N°7 des 9 Grands Duos pour 2 clarinettes
 Presto pour 4 clarinettes
 Ritournelle pour clarinette et piano
 Romance pour clarinette et piano
 Saturn pour saxophone et piano
 Soleil pour clarinette et piano
 Sonatina pour clarinette et piano
 Sonatine In C pour saxhorn basse (tuba) et piano
 Style Fugue N°6 des 9 Grands Duos pour 2 clarinettes
 Suite d'Airs Populaires pour hautbois, clarinette et basson
 Suite pour quatuor de Trombones (1949)
 Suite Tocellane pour clarinette et piano
 Symphonie des Clarinettes pour 6 clarinettes
 Terre pour trombone et piano
 Triptyque pour clarinette et piano
 Tryptique pour harpe solo et sextuor (flûte, hautbois, clarinette, cor, basson, contrabasse)
 Trois vocalises pour hautbois et piano
 Tubissimo pour saxhorn basse en sib ou euphonium ou ophicléide en sib et piano
 Uranus pour trombone et piano
 Variations N°8 des 9 Grands Duos pour 2 clarinettes
 Véga pour trombone et piano
 Vénus pour clarinette et piano
 Vesta pour clarinette et piano
 Voyages Imaginaires pour saxophone et piano, ou 2 violons et harpe, ou piano et violoncelle

Accordion Work
 Suite Brève für Akkordeon solo

Pedagogical Works
 La Pédagogie des Ensembles de Clarinettes
 Volume 1: Pour les débutants pour 4 clarinettes
 Volume 2: Choral pour 6 clarinettes
 Volume 3: Gavotte pour 4 clarinettes
 Volume 4: Prélude inaltéré pour 5 clarinettes
 Volume 5: Comme une barcarolle pour 4 clarinettes
 Volume 6: Petite fugue pour 2 clarinettes
 Volume 7: Menuet pour 4 clarinettes
 Volume 8: Marche promenade pour 6 clarinettes
 Volume 9: Rhapsodie pour 5 clarinettes

References

Sources
Rehrig, William F. Heritage Encyclopedia of Band Music.  Waterville, Ohio: Integrity Press, 1991 and 1996; 
Stoneham, Marshall. Wind Ensemble Sourcebook and Biographical Guide. Westport, Conn.: Greenwood Press, 1997; 

1921 births
2015 deaths
Concert band composers
People from Laon
Conservatoire de Paris alumni
French male conductors (music)
French classical clarinetists
Place of death missing
Chevaliers of the Légion d'honneur
20th-century French conductors (music)
20th-century French male musicians